Mộ Đức is a township and capital of Mộ Đức District, Quảng Ngãi Province, Vietnam.

References

Populated places in Quảng Ngãi province
District capitals in Vietnam
Townships in Vietnam